Rodrigo Carrillo Pérez (4 February 1964 – 19 October 2002) was a Mexican politician from the Party of the Democratic Revolution. From 2000 to 2002 he served as Deputy of the LVIII Legislature of the Mexican Congress representing the State of Mexico.

References

1964 births
2002 deaths
Politicians from Mexico City
Party of the Democratic Revolution politicians
21st-century Mexican politicians
Members of the Chamber of Deputies (Mexico) for the State of Mexico